The 2021 French Open's order of play for main draw matches on the three main tennis courts, starting from May 30 until June 13. 

All dates are in CEST.

Day 1 (30 May) 
Seeds out:
 Men's Singles:  Dominic Thiem [4],  Grigor Dimitrov [16],  Hubert Hurkacz [19],  Dan Evans [25]
 Women's Singles:  Angelique Kerber [26]
Schedule of play

Day 2 (31 May) 
Seeds out: 
 Men's Singles:  David Goffin [13],  Lorenzo Sonego [26]
 Women's Singles:  Bianca Andreescu [6],  Garbiñe Muguruza [12],  Kiki Bertens [16],  Johanna Konta [19],  Petra Martić [22]
Schedule of play

Day 3 (1 June) 
Seeds out:
 Men's Singles:  Andrey Rublev [7],  Félix Auger-Aliassime [20],  Ugo Humbert [29]
 Women's Singles:  Naomi Osaka [2],  Petra Kvitová [11]
 Men's Doubles:  Łukasz Kubot /  Marcelo Melo [8],  Henri Kontinen /  Édouard Roger-Vasselin [12]
Schedule of play

Day 4 (2 June) 
Seeds out:
 Men's Singles:  Roberto Bautista Agut [11],  Karen Khachanov [23]
 Women's Singles:  Belinda Bencic [10],  Veronika Kudermetova [29]
Men's Doubles:  Nikola Mektić /  Mate Pavić [1]
Women's Doubles:  Alexa Guarachi /  Desirae Krawczyk [5],  Tímea Babos /  Vera Zvonareva [7]

Schedule of play

Day 5 (3 June)
Seeds out:
 Men's Singles:  Gaël Monfils [14],  Alex de Minaur [21],  Aslan Karatsev [24],  Nikoloz Basilashvili [28],  Taylor Fritz [30]
 Women's Singles:  Ashleigh Barty [1],  Karolína Plíšková [9],  Ekaterina Alexandrova [32]
Men's Doubles:  Marcel Granollers /  Horacio Zeballos [4],  Ivan Dodig /  Filip Polášek [5],   Jérémy Chardy /  Fabrice Martin [13],  Raven Klaasen /  Ben McLachlan [15]

Schedule of play

Day 6 (4 June)
Seeds out:
Men's Singles:  Casper Ruud [15],  Fabio Fognini [27],  John Isner [31],  Reilly Opelka [32]
 Women's Singles:  Aryna Sabalenka [3],  Madison Keys [23]
Men's Doubles:  Rajeev Ram /  Joe Salisbury [3],  John Peers /  Michael Venus [10],   Marcus Daniell /  Philipp Oswald [16]
Women's Doubles:  Xu Yifan /  Zhang Shuai [8],  Ellen Perez /  Zheng Saisai [13],  Nadiia Kichenok /  Raluca Olaru [16]
Mixed Doubles:  Xu Yifan /  Bruno Soares [4]
Schedule of play

Day 7 (5 June)
 Seeds out:
 Women's Singles:  Elina Svitolina [5],  Jennifer Brady [13],  Elise Mertens [14],  Karolína Muchová [18],  Jessica Pegula [28],  Anett Kontaveit [30]
Men's Doubles:  Jamie Murray /  Bruno Soares [7],  Wesley Koolhof /  Jean-Julien Rojer [11]
Women's Doubles:  Shuko Aoyama /  Ena Shibahara [4],  Monica Niculescu /  Jeļena Ostapenko [12]
Schedule of play

Day 8 (6 June) 
 Seeds out:
Men's Singles:  Roger Federer [8],  Pablo Carreño Busta [12],  Cristian Garín [22]
 Women's Singles:  Serena Williams [7],  Victoria Azarenka [15],  Markéta Vondroušová [20]
Men's Doubles:  Sander Gillé /  Joran Vliegen [14]
Women's Doubles:  Hsieh Su-wei /  Elise Mertens [1],  Lucie Hradecká /  Laura Siegemund [10]
Schedule of play

Day 9 (7 June) 
 Seeds out:
Men's Singles:  Jannik Sinner [18]
Women's Singles:  Sofia Kenin [4],  Ons Jabeur [25]
Women's Doubles:  Nicole Melichar /  Demi Schuurs [3],  Chan Hao-ching /  Latisha Chan [6],  Sharon Fichman /  Giuliana Olmos [9]
Mixed Doubles:  Barbora Krejčíková /  Filip Polášek [1],  Nicole Melichar /  Rajeev Ram [2]
Schedule of play

Day 10 (8 June) 
 Seeds out:
Men's Singles:  Daniil Medvedev [2]
Women's Singles:  Elena Rybakina [21],  Paula Badosa [33]
Men's Doubles:  Kevin Krawietz /  Horia Tecău [9]
Women's Doubles:  Darija Jurak /  Andreja Klepač [11]
Mixed Doubles:  Demi Schuurs /  Wesley Koolhof [3]
Schedule of play

Day 11 (9 June) 
 Seeds out:
Men's Singles:  Matteo Berrettini [9],  Diego Schwartzman [10]
Women's Singles:  Iga Świątek [8],  Coco Gauff [24]
Schedule of play

Day 12 (10 June) 
 Seeds out:
Women's Singles:  Maria Sakkari [17]
Men's Doubles:  Juan Sebastián Cabal /  Robert Farah [2]
Schedule of play

Day 13 (11 June) 
 Seeds out:
Men's Singles:  Rafael Nadal [3],  Alexander Zverev [6]
Schedule of play

Day 14 (12 June) 
 Seeds out:
Women's Singles:  Anastasia Pavlyuchenkova [31]
Schedule of play

Day 15 (13 June) 
 Seeds out:
Men's Singles:  Stefanos Tsitsipas [5]
Women's Doubles:  Bethanie Mattek-Sands /  Iga Świątek [14]
Schedule of play

References

Day-by-day summaries
French Open by year – Day-by-day summaries